Protosticta rufostigma, is a damselfly species in the family Platystictidae. It is endemic to Western Ghats in India.

The genus Protosticta has eleven species reported from India, of which nine are known from Western Ghats.

It is currently known only from the type locality Naraikadu, which is a part of the Kalakkad Mundanthurai Tiger Reserve. It is closely related to Protosticta davenporti but can be distinguished by the larger pterostigma, difference in the pattern of prothorax and the eighth abdominal segment, and the shape of the anal appendages.

See also 
 List of odonates of India
 List of odonata of Kerala

References

External links

Platystictidae
Insects of India
Insects described in 1958